Eutrepsia inconstans is a species of geometrid moth in the family Geometridae. It is found in Central America and North America.

The MONA or Hodges number for Eutrepsia inconstans is 7284.

References

Further reading

 
 

Hydriomenini
Articles created by Qbugbot
Moths described in 1837